Chaotic Ana is a 2007 Spanish drama film written, directed, and edited by Julio Medem which stars Manuela Vellés as the title character.

Plot

A synopsis prior to the release of the film stated:

"Caotica Ana is the story-journey of Ana during four years of her life, from 18 to 22. A countdown, 10, 9, 8, 7... until 0, like in hypnosis, through which Ana proves that she does not live alone, that her existence seems like a continuation of other lives of young women who died in a tragic way, all at the age of 22, and who live in the abyss of her unconscious memory. This is her chaos. Ana is the princess and the monster of this feminist fable against the tyranny of man."

Cast

Production and filming
Chaotic Ana is Medem's first new narrative film since his 2001 film Sex and Lucia, and his follow-up to the controversial documentary La pelota vasca. As with the former, this film has been shot in HD, using the Sony HDC-950. The film is a co-production of Medem's own production company Alicia Produce alongside Sogecine and Volcano Films, and it had the participation of TVE, Canal+, and ETB.

Medem's regular composer Alberto Iglesias could not score the film.
Filmed in New York, Arizona, Madrid, and the Canary and Balearic islands.

This film, and story, was an attempt by director Medem to cope with the deep depression that he was suffering after the tragic accident of his younger sister, Ana, who was killed in a car accident on 28 April 2001 when it was heading towards the wine town of Cariñena, Zaragoza, where an expo of her wax paintings was going to take place. Her other brother, Alvaro, was driving the car. In her memory, Julio has a daughter named after her. As he said: "It is an attempt to escape from my own memories without achieving it as she did".

Release 
Distributed by Sogepaq, it premiered in Spain in August 2007.

See also 
 List of Spanish films of 2007

References

External links
 
 Information on the film on JulioMedem.org
 Art in Caotica Ana

2007 films
2007 drama films
2000s Spanish-language films
Berber-language films
2000s French-language films
2000s English-language films
2000s Arabic-language films
Madrid in fiction
Films about hypnosis
Films set in New York City
Films set in Arizona
Films shot in the Canary Islands
Films directed by Julio Medem
Films scored by Jocelyn Pook
Spanish drama films
2007 multilingual films
Spanish multilingual films
Sogecine films
2000s Spanish films